Mark Bloom (born November 25, 1987) is a retired American soccer player. Bloom played as a defender.

Career

Youth and amateur
Born in Marietta, Georgia, Bloom played college soccer at Berry College, where he was a second-team All-Southern States Athletic Conference selection as a junior in 2008, and was his team's MVP in his senior year in 2009. During his time with Berry he helped the school to a 48-26-5 record, two conference titles, and scored 13 goals.

During his college years Bloom also played in the USL Premier Development League both in the Atlanta Silverbacks U23's and the Southern California Seahorses.

Professional
Bloom signed his first professional contract in 2010 when he was signed by AC St. Louis of the USSF Division 2 Professional League. He made his professional debut on April 10, 2010, in St. Louis's first ever game, against Carolina RailHawks Bloom joined Charlotte Eagles of the USL Pro league for the 2011 season.

In 2013, Bloom joined the Atlanta Silverbacks of the NASL. He was loaned to Toronto FC on July 12, 2013. He made his Major League Soccer debut on September 14, 2013, playing a full 90 minutes in an away loss to New York Red Bulls. Bloom's loan option was exercised by Toronto FC, making a permanent move to the club the following season. On January 13, 2015, it was announced that he re-signed with the team on a multi-year deal.

On March 25, 2016, Bloom was loaned to affiliate club Toronto FC II. He made his debut the following day in a 2–2 draw with New York Red Bulls II.

On December 13, 2016, he was traded to Atlanta United for Clint Irwin who was selected by Atlanta United FC in the third round of the 2016 MLS Expansion Draft.

As of December 2017, Bloom had his contract option with Atlanta United declined. He subsequently retired from professional football to work as a financial advisor.

References

External links
 Toronto FC bio

1987 births
Living people
Sportspeople from Marietta, Georgia
American soccer players
American expatriate soccer players
Atlanta Silverbacks U23's players
Southern California Seahorses players
AC St. Louis players
Charlotte Eagles players
Atlanta Silverbacks players
Toronto FC players
Soccer players from Georgia (U.S. state)
Expatriate soccer players in Canada
USL League Two players
USSF Division 2 Professional League players
USL Championship players
North American Soccer League players
Major League Soccer players
Association football fullbacks
Atlanta United FC players
Toronto FC II players